"Ready for Your Love" is a song by English electronic music production duo Gorgon City featuring vocals from MNEK. Released on 26 January 2014 as the second single from their debut studio album Sirens, it entered the UK Singles Chart at number four.

Music video
The music video for the song was released onto Gorgon City's YouTube channel on 19 December 2013, lasting a total length of three minutes and twenty-eight seconds.

Critical reception
Robert Copsey of Digital Spy reviewed the song positively and gave it a 3.5 out of 5 rating, saying "The track itself strips house back to basics, where synths are sprinkled over the verses only to be swept away for the looping chorus. It's simplicity allows fellow rising star MNEK to make his mark as the guest feature, his rich and distinctive vocal elevating an already uplifting track to new heights."

Track listing

Personnel
 Kye "Foamo" Gibbon – producer, instruments
 Matt "RackNRuin" Robson-Scott – producer, instruments
 Uzoechi "MNEK" Emenike – vocals

Charts

Weekly charts

Year-end charts

Certifications

References

2014 songs
2014 singles
Gorgon City songs
MNEK songs
Virgin EMI Records singles
Black Butter Records singles
Songs written by MNEK
Songs written by Kye Gibbon
Songs written by Matt Robson-Scott